The Geneva Conventions, which were most recently revised in 1949, consist of seven individual treaties which are open to ratification or accession by any sovereign state. They are:
The Geneva Conventions
First Geneva Convention
Second Geneva Convention
Third Geneva Convention
Fourth Geneva Convention
Additional Protocols
Protocol I
Protocol II
Protocol III

The four 1949 Conventions have been ratified by 196 states, including all UN member states, both UN observers the Holy See and the State of Palestine, as well as the Cook Islands. The Protocols have been ratified by 174, 169 and 79 states respectively.  In addition, Article 90 of Protocol I states that "The High Contracting Parties may at the time of signing, ratifying or acceding to the Protocol, or at any other subsequent time, declare that they recognize ipso facto and without special agreement, in relation to any other High Contracting Party accepting the same obligation, the competence of the [International Fact-Finding] Commission to enquire into allegations by such other Party, as authorized by this Article."  76 states have made such a declaration.

Parties to the 1949 Conventions and Protocols I–III
Below is a list of state parties to the Geneva Conventions.

Notes

Former states parties
The following states were party to the Geneva Conventions I–IV, but their ratifications have not been recognised as applying to any succeeding state under international law:

 Czechoslovakia
 East Germany
 South Vietnam
 South Yemen
 Yugoslavia
 Zanzibar.

Authorities making a unilateral declaration
Article 96.3 of Protocol I allows for an "authority representing a people engaged against a High Contracting Party in an armed conflict" to make a unilateral declaration to apply the four Conventions and Protocol I with respect to that conflict.  As of 2015 this provision has been utilized by the Polisario Front in 2015.

Parties to the 1864 Geneva Convention
The first ten articles of the First Geneva Convention were concluded in 1864. This was the original Geneva Convention. The following states were parties to the 1864 Geneva Convention.

Notes

References

Geneva Conventions
Geneva Conventions